Evelyn Charles Henry Vivian ( – ) was the pseudonym of Charles Henry Cannell, a British editor and writer of fantasy and supernatural, detective novels and stories.

Biography
Prior to becoming a writer, Cannell was a former soldier in the Boer War and journalist for The Daily Telegraph. Cannell began writing novels under the pen-name "E. Charles Vivian" in 1907. Cannell started writing fantastic stories for the arts magazine Colour and the aviation journal Flying (which Cannell edited after leaving the Telegraph) in 1917–18, sometimes publishing them under the pseudonym "A.K. Walton".
Vivian is best known for his Lost World fantasy novels such as City of Wonder 
 and his series of novels featuring supernatural detective Gregory George Gordon Green or "Gees" which he wrote under his "Jack Mann" pseudonym. Vivian also wrote several science-fiction stories, including
the novel Star Dust about a scientist who can create gold. 
Critic Jack Adrian has praised Cannell's lost-world stories as "bursting with ideas and colour and pace", and
"superb examples of a fascinating breed".
Influences on Vivian's work included Rider Haggard, H.G. Wells, Arthur Machen
and the American novelist Arthur O. Friel. Vivian also published fiction under several
other pseudonyms, including Westerns as "Barry Lynd".  Adrian has noted that some of the pseudonyms
Cannell used "will never now be identified".
For younger readers, Vivian wrote Robin Hood and his Merry Men, a retelling of the 
Robin Hood legend.

Vivian also edited three British pulp magazines. From 1918 to 1922 Vivian edited The Novel Magazine, and later, for the publisher Walter Hutchinson (1887–1950), Hutchinson's Adventure-Story Magazine (which serialised three of Vivian's novels) and Hutchinson's Mystery-Story Magazine. In addition to
UK writers, Vivian often reprinted fiction from American pulp magazines such as Adventure and Weird Tales in the Hutchinson publications.

Outside the field of fiction, Vivian was noted for the non-fiction book, A History of Aeronautics.

Some of the popular errors about his life are now corrected in the first and only full-length biography, The Shadow of Mr Vivian: The Life of E. Charles Vivian (1882-1947) by Peter Berresford Ellis, PS Publishing Ltd, Hornsea, UK, 2014.

Works

Gees Series
 Gees First Case (1936)
 Grey Shapes (1937) 
 Nightmare Farm (1937)
 The Kleinart Case (1938)
 Maker of Shadows (1938)
 The Ninth Life (1939)
 The Glass Too Many (1940)
 Her Ways Are Death (1940)

Rex Coulson
 Coulson Goes South (1933)
 Reckless Coulson (1933)
 Dead Man's Chest (1934)
 Egyptian Nights (1934)
 Coulson Alone (1936)
 Detective Coulson (1936)

Fields of Sleep

 Fields of Sleep (Fantasy, 1923)
 People of the Darkness (Fantasy, 1924)

Terence Byrne
 Girl in the Dark (1933)
 The Man With the Scar (1940)
 Vain Escape (1952)

Jerry Head
 Accessory After (1934)
 Shadow on the House (1934)
 Seventeen Cards (1935)
 Cigar for Inspector Head (1935)
 Who Killed Gatton? (1936)
 With Intent to Kill (1936)
 38 Automatic (1937)
 Tramp's Evidence/The Barking Dog Murder Case (1937)
 Evidence in Blue/The Man in Grey (1938)
 The Rainbow Puzzle (1938)
 Problem by Rail (1939)
 Touch and Go (1939)

Robin Hood
 Adventures of Robin Hood (1906)
 Robin Hood and His Merry Men (1927)

Others
 The Shadow of Christine (1907)
 The Woman Tempted Me (1909)
 Wandering of Desire (1910)
 Following Feet (1911)
 Passion-Fruit (1912)
 Divided Ways (1914)
 The Young Man Absalom (1915)
 The Yellow Streak: A story of the South African veld (1921)
 City of Wonder (Fantasy, 1922)
 Broken Couplings (1923)
 The Guarded Woman (1923)
 A Scout of the '45 (Historical Novel, 1923)
 Barker's Drift (1924)
 The Lady of the Terraces (Fantasy, 1925)
 Ash (1925)
 Star Dust (1925)
 A King There Was (Fantasy, 1926) [sequal to The Lady of the Terrace]
 The Passionless Quest (1926)
 The Forbidden Door (Fantasy, 1927)
 Shooting Stars (Film Adaptation, 1928)
 Man Alone (1928)
 Nine Days (1928)
 The Moon and Chelsea (1928)
 The Tale of Fleur (Fantasy, 1929)
 Woman Dominant (Fantasy, 1930)
 Guardian of the Cup (1930)
 One Tropic Night (1930)
 Double or Quit (1930)
 Delicate Fiend (1930)
 Unwashed Gods (1931)
 Innocent Guilt (1931)
 And the Devil (1931)
 Infamous Fame (1932)
 False Truth (1932)
 Ladies in the Case (1933)
 The Keys of the Flat (1933)
 Jewels Go Back (1934)
 The Capsule Mystery (1935)
 The Black Prince (Historical, 1936)
 The Impossible Crime (1940)
 And Then There Was One (1941)
 Curses Come Home (1942)
 Dangerous Guide (1943)
 Samson (1944)
 She Who Will Not- (1945)
 Other Gods (1945)
 Arrested (1949)

Westerns
(as Barry Lynd)
 Dude Ranch (1938)
 Trailed Down (1938)
 Riders to Bald Butte (1939)
 Ghost Canyon (1939)
 The Ten-Buck Trail (1941)
 George on the Trail (1942)

Non-fiction
 The British Army from Within (c. 1914)
 Peru (1914)
 With the Royal Army Medical Corps at the Front (c, 1915)
 With the Scottish Regiments at the Front (1916)
 A History of Aeronautics (1921)

Footnotes

References
 Jack Adrian,"Vivian, E(velyn) C(harles)", in the St. James Guide To Fantasy Writers, edited by David Pringle. St. James Press, 1996,pp. 577–80.

 Peter Berresford Ellis, The Shadow of Mr Vivian: The Life of E. Charles Vivian (1882-1947), PS Publishing Ltd, Hornsea, UK, 2014.

 John Clute; Peter Nicholls. The Encyclopedia of Science Fiction. New York: St. Martin's Press. .

External links
 
 
 
 
 E. C. Vivian at Manybooks.net
  (as by Vivian; see also linked pseudonyms)

1882 births
1947 deaths
English non-fiction writers
English magazine editors
English fantasy writers
English crime fiction writers
English horror writers
English science fiction writers
Western (genre) writers
English male short story writers
English short story writers
English male novelists
20th-century English novelists
20th-century British short story writers
20th-century English male writers
English male non-fiction writers